Novotavlarovo (Yañı Tawlar) is a rural locality (a village) in Akbarisovsky Selsoviet, Sharansky District, Bashkortostan, Russia. The population was 219 as of 2010. There are 2 streets.

Geography 
Novotavlarovo is located 15 km northeast of Sharan (the district's administrative centre) by road. Akbarisovo is the nearest rural locality.

References 

Rural localities in Sharansky District